Tharlis Sartori (born 7 January 1998), simply known as Tharlis, is a Brazilian footballer who plays as a midfielder for Azuriz.

Club career
Tharlis was born in Maravilha, Santa Catarina, and joined Chapecoense's youth setup in 2016, from Internacional. Promoted to the main squad for the 2019 season, he made his first team debut on 20 January of that year, coming on as a late substitute for Edgardo Orzuza in a 0–0 Campeonato Catarinense away draw against Metropolitano.

Tharlis made his Série A debut on 1 May 2019, starting in a 0–1 loss at Corinthians. Twenty days later, he renewed his contract until December 2021.

Career statistics

Honours
Chapecoense
Campeonato Catarinense: 2020
Campeonato Brasileiro Série B: 2020

References

External links
Chapecoense profile 

1998 births
Living people
Sportspeople from Santa Catarina (state)
Brazilian footballers
Association football midfielders
Campeonato Brasileiro Série A players
Associação Chapecoense de Futebol players